Theodore S. Jones (1919-1976) was a member of the Wisconsin State Assembly.

Biography
Jones was born on January 27, 1919, in Lake Mills, Wisconsin. He attended Carroll University before going on to work for the New York Life Insurance Company. Later, he served in the United States Marine Corps during World War II and became chairman of the Wisconsin chapter of the United Service Organizations. He died of a heart attack on December 15, 1976, in Lake Mills, Wisconsin.

Political career
Jones was first elected to the Assembly in 1946 as a Republican. In 1958, he was an unsuccessful candidate as a Democrat.

References

People from Lake Mills, Wisconsin
Members of the Wisconsin State Assembly
Wisconsin Republicans
Wisconsin Democrats
Military personnel from Wisconsin
United States Marines
United States Marine Corps personnel of World War II
Carroll University alumni
1919 births
1976 deaths
20th-century American politicians